

Marguerite Bourgeoys Park is a park in the Pointe-Saint-Charles neighbourhood of the Le Sud-Ouest borough of Montreal, Quebec, Canada. It is bordered by du Parc Marguerite-Bourgeoys Street to the north and east, des Filles du Roy Street to the south, and Wellington Street to the west.

The park was created in 1910. It initially was named Monahan Park. It was renamed Marguerite Bourgeoys Park in 1922.

The park is named for Marguerite Bourgeoys, the French founder of the Congregation of Notre Dame of Montreal in the colony of New France (present-day Quebec). She has been declared a Saint by the Catholic Church.

Art

Le Village imaginé. «Le Renard l’emporte, le suit à la trace…»

The City of Montreal commissioned a sculpture for the park, created by  Pierre Bourgault. Le Village imaginé. «Le Renard l’emporte, le suit à la trace…» is composed of five elements set in various parts of the park.

References

Outdoor sculptures in Montreal
Parks in Montreal
Le Sud-Ouest